The Latvian Land Forces together with the Latvian National Guard form the land warfare branch of the Latvian National Armed Forces. Since 2007, land forces are organized as a fully professional standing army.

Mission
The main missions of the national Land Forces are to:
 Provide for the defense of all national territories;
 Ensure combat readiness and the mobilization of units;
 Dispose of explosive ordnance;
 Provide public assistance.

Structure

  Mechanized Infantry Brigade
  Headquarters
  Headquarters and Signal Company
  1st Mechanized Infantry Battalion
 Headquarters and Support Company
 1st Mechanized Infantry Company
 2nd Mechanized Infantry Company
 3rd Mechanized Infantry Company
 Combat Service Support Company
  2nd Mechanized Infantry Battalion
 Headquarters and Support Company
 1st Mechanized Infantry Company
 2nd Mechanized Infantry Company
 3rd Mechanized Infantry Company
 Combat Service Support Company
  3rd Infantry Battalion (trains active service soldiers, national guardsmen and reserve soldiers)
 Headquarters and Support Company
 1st Infantry Company
 2nd Infantry Company
 3rd Infantry Company
 Combat Service Support Company
  Artillery Unit (M109A5Ö howitzers)
  Combat Support Battalion
 Staff and Signal Company
 Anti-tank Company (Spike-LR missiles)
 Fire Support Company
 Engineer Company
 Military Intelligence Company
 Forward Air Control Unit
  Combat Service Support Battalion
 Staff and Signal Company
 Supply and Transport Company
 Technical Support and Maintenance Company
 Medical Company

Cooperation

Since 1996 till today the National Armed Forces' soldiers have been deployed on nine international peace-keeping missions in Afghanistan, Albania, Bosnia, Central African Republic, Georgia, Iraq, Kosovo, North Macedonia and Somalia. Starting from January 1, 2015, Latvian Armed Forces are taking part in EU's Nordic Battle Group. On March 29, 2004, Latvia became a fully fledged member of the NATO.

Equipment

Rank structure
The rank structure of the Latvian army is adjusted to the rank structure of the NATO countries in Europe. Rank insignia are worn historically on the collars and today also on shoulder marks. Starting 2016, only the Staff Battalion wears the collar insignia.

References

External links 
 Ministry of Defense of the Republic of Latvia
 Mission of Latvia to NATO

Military of Latvia
Military units and formations established in 1918
Military units and formations disestablished in 1940
Military units and formations established in 1991
1991 establishments in Latvia